Joana Lourenço  Magalhães (born 4 June 2004) is a Luxembourger footballer who plays as a forward for Dames Ligue 1 club Young Boys Diekirch and the Luxembourg women's national team.

International career
Joana Lourenco Magalhães made her senior debut for Luxembourg on 12 June 2021 during a 0–1 friendly loss against Belgium.

International goals

Personal life
Joana has a twin sister, Mariana, who plays alongside her at club level, and also has been capped by Luxembourg.

References

2004 births
Living people
Women's association football forwards
Luxembourgian women's footballers
Luxembourg women's international footballers
Luxembourgian people of Portuguese descent